See also Quick Millions (1931 film) starring Spencer Tracy and George RaftQuick Millions is a 1939 American comedy film co-written by Buster Keaton, one of the series of seventeen Jones Family films beginning with Every Saturday Night (1936) and ending with On Their Own'' (1940).  Spring Byington appeared in all seventeen; Jed Prouty in all but the last one. In this entry the Joneses are convinced they've bought the Grand Canyon.  This is one of the two Jones Family films with gags and a story line provided by Keaton, briefly moonlighting from MGM for his old friend Malcolm St. Clair, the director of this film.

Cast 
 Jed Prouty as John Jones
 Spring Byington as Mrs. John Jones
 Kenneth Howell as Jack Jones 
 George Ernest as Roger Jones
 June Carlson as Lucy Jones
 Florence Roberts as Granny Jones
 Billy Mahan as Bobby Jones
 Eddie Collins as Henry 'Beaver' Howard
 Robert Shaw as National Park Ranger Barry Frazier
 Helen Ericson as Daisy Landers
 Marvin Stephens as Tommy McGuire
 Paul Hurst as Sheriff
 John T. Murray as Professor Pete Mathews
 George Lynn as H. Jenkins 'Hank' Pierson 
 Horace McMahon as Floyd 'Bat' Douglas
 John Sheehan as Fire Chief
 Eddie Dunn as Deputy Sheriff
 George Guhl as Deputy and Jailer
 Billy Griffith as Druggist
 Edwin Gaffney as Gas Station Attendant
 Edward McWade as Storekeeper
 Arthur Rankin as Notary
 Clarence Wilson as Assayer 
 Douglas Gerrard as Indian

References

External links 
 

1939 films
20th Century Fox films
American black-and-white films
Films directed by Malcolm St. Clair
American comedy films
1939 comedy films
1930s American films